Marks Barfield Architects is a London-based architectural firm founded by husband and wife David Marks and Julia Barfield. Their work has included the London Eye, the treetop walkway in Kew Gardens, the i360 observation tower in Brighton, England and Cambridge Mosque.

Works

 Liverpool Watersports Centre (1994)
 Waterloo Millenium Pier (1999)
 London Eye (2000)
 Stoke Newington Watersports Centre (2002)
 Millbank Millennium Pier (2004)
 Spiral Café, Birmingham (2004)
 The Lightbox, Woking (2007)
 The Michael Tippett School (2008)
 Treetop Walkway at Kew Gardens (2008)
 Wembley White Horse Bridge & Public Realm (2008)
 Think Tank, Lincoln (2008)
 Greenwich Gateway Pavilions (2015)
 University of Cambridge Primary School (2015)
 i360, Brighton (2016)
 Cambridge Mosque (2018)
Proposed project
 Amazon Science Centre, including a six-mile rainforest canopy walkway (2012)

References

External links
 

Architecture firms based in London